USS Mahaska  may refer to the following ships of the United States Navy:

  was a wooden, double-ender, sidewheel steamer, launched in 1861 and sold in 1868.
  was a yard tug, purchased in 1940 and served until at least 1969.

United States Navy ship names